William Thomas Sutherlin (April 7, 1822 – July 22, 1893) was a  tobacco planter, distributor, industrialist, Confederate quartermaster and politician. He served as mayor of Danville, Virginia (1855-1861), as its delegate to the Virginia Secession Convention of 1861 and later for one term in the Virginia House of Delegates (1871-1873) Sutherlin's plantation home became the temporary residence for President of the Confederate States of America Jefferson Davis and his Cabinet from April 3 – April 10, 1865, the week before Gen. Robert E. Lee surrendered the Army of Northern Virginia at Appomattox Courthouse.

Early and family life

Born in 1822 to George Sanders Sutherlin (1796-1856) and his wife, the former Polly Starlings Norman (1794-1860). His grandfather bought a large tract north of Danville in 1798. The Sutherlin family included at least three additional boys and two girls: John M. Sutherlin, George Haskins Sutherlin (1826-1861), Paulina Lane Sutherlin (b.1824) and Narcissa Adeline Sutherlin Hodnett (1820-1888). His youngest brother, Nathaniel Green Sutherlin (1836-1843), never reached adulthood.
William T. Sutherlin married  Jeanie Erwin Patrick (1827-1911) in October 1849 in Greensboro, North Carolina. She would survive him by more than a decade, as would their daughter Janine

Career

A planter and industrialist, William T. Sutherlin used enslaved black labor, owning nine boys 10–16 years old and 25 adult males between 18 and 50 years old in 1850. An entrepreneur and industrialist, Sutherlin developed ways to improve the process of preparing the region's bright leaf tobacco for market, as there was great demand for this commodity. Before the Civil War, Sutherlin was the first Virginian to apply steam power to hydraulic tobacco presses; he owned and operated the second-largest tobacco factory in the state. Sutherlin also founded and served as the first president of the Bank of Danville.

In 1855, Sutherlin was elected as Danville's mayor and served for 6 years. He resigned the office after being as one of its two delegates to the Virginia Convention of 1861. Sutherlin opposed secession on the initial vote, but changed his vote after Fort Sumter was fired upon on April 12, 1861.

American Civil War

In his 40s and with worse health than his brother George H. Sutherland (who volunteered, became a lieutenant in the 38th Virginia Infantry and died in Richmond in December 1861), William Sutherlin could not serve in the active military. Appointed instead as Quartermaster of Danville, a primary Confederate supply depot and arsenal. Sutherlin rose to the rank of major, and his duties included oversight of food, medicine, and arms supply. Major Sutherlin also allowed his tobacco factory to be used as a prison for captured Union soldiers.

As Union troops were on the verge of capturing the Confederate capitol of Richmond, Virginia, on April 3, 1865, Confederate President Jefferson Davis and his cabinet fled south on the Richmond and Danville Railroad for Danville. Sutherlin opened his home to the beleaguered executive and his cabinet as a temporary residence until April 10.  Here Davis wrote and signed his last official proclamation as President of the Confederacy, dissolving the government, before continuing south to Greensboro, North Carolina.

Postwar

After the war, Sutherlin continued to cultivate his plantation and pursue business ventures. He became a member of the Committee of Nine which opposed provisions in the new proposed state constitution from the Virginia Constitutional Convention of 1868. In 1871 Danville and Pittsylvania County voters elected him as one of their two (part time) representatives in the Virginia General Assembly, where he served a single two-year term.

Death and legacy
Sutherlin died in 1893, survived by his widow and daughter. He is buried in the family plot in what became Green Hill Cemetery. His papers are held by the University of North Carolina Special Collections library. The William T Sutherlin Mansion has been adapted for use as the Danville Museum of Fine Arts and History. It has been listed on the National Register of Historic Places.

References

http://www.danvillemuseum.org/index.php?page_id=19 "William T. Sutherlin"], Danville Museum of Fine Arts and History

External links
Danville Museum of Fine Arts and History

1822 births
1893 deaths
Confederate States Army officers
American Civil War industrialists
People of Virginia in the American Civil War
Virginia Secession Delegates of 1861
American planters
Mayors of places in Virginia
Members of the Virginia House of Delegates
Politicians from Danville, Virginia
Businesspeople from Virginia
19th-century American politicians
American slave owners